Tudor Monastery Farm is a British factual television series, first broadcast on BBC Two on 13 November 2013. The series, the fifth in the historic farm series, following the original, Tales from the Green Valley, stars archaeologists Peter Ginn and Tom Pinfold, and historian Ruth Goodman. The team discover what farming was like during the Tudor period at the Weald and Downland Open Air Museum.  The program also recurringly features other historians, such as Colin Richards (an expert on rural crafts), and Professor Ronald Hutton (who specializes in folklore and religious beliefs).

Production

On 8 August 2013, the BBC announced the series. David Upshal, the executive producer of Lion Television, said: "We are delighted to be continuing with a new Farm series for BBC Two, taking us back to the earliest point in history we have tackled yet. Following the huge success of the Victorian, Edwardian and Wartime Farms, the new series will see us produce our 50th episode in this on-going, immersive living-history adventure." The series was co-commissioned between Martin Davidson and Aaqil Ahmed.

The filming location is the farm at the Weald and Downland Open Air Museum, Sussex.

Episode list

2013 Christmas special
On 25 November 2013, the BBC announced that Tudor Monastery Farm would have a Christmas special which explored the festive season as part of BBC Two's Christmas scheduling. The episode was broadcast on 31 December 2013 and overnight figures showed that it attracted 1.57 million viewers (8.06% of the viewing audience). Official figures raised the number of viewers to 1.76 million.

Reception
Time Out Danielle Goldstein gave it three out of five stars and called it "intriguing". Gerard O'Donovan of The Daily Telegraph gave it four out of five stars and said that history had been brought "brilliantly to life on BBC Two". James Alexander Cameron said "Although a little guilty of choosing the National Curriculum-friendly “Tudor” label over “Medieval”,...it remains a rather interesting little programme for a Medievalist Art Historian to have a look at."

Home media
The DVD edition was released on 10 February 2014.

References

External links
 
 
 

2013 British television series debuts
2013 British television series endings
English-language television shows
Television shows set in the United Kingdom
Television series by All3Media
Television shows about agriculture
Renaissance reenactment
Historical reality television series
BBC historic farm series
BBC television documentaries about history during the 16th and 17th centuries